Sagamichthys is a genus of tubeshoulders. The generic name derives from Sagami Bay, Japan (home of Sagamichthys abei), and the Greek ἰχθύς (ichthys), "fish".

Species
There are currently three recognized species in this genus:
 Sagamichthys abei A. E. Parr, 1953 (Shining tubeshoulder)
 Sagamichthys gracilis Sazonov, 1978
 Sagamichthys schnakenbecki (Gerhard Krefft, 1953) (Schnakenbeck's searsid)

References

Platytroctidae
Ray-finned fish genera